Gerrit Voges (11 July 1932 – 21 June 2007) was a Dutch footballer. He played in two matches for the Netherlands national football team in 1956.

References

External links
 

1932 births
2007 deaths
Dutch footballers
Netherlands international footballers
Place of birth missing
Association footballers not categorized by position